Pal, alternative form "Paul", is a common surname found in India and Bangladesh. It is traditionally believed that 'Pal' originated from the Sanskrit pala meaning protector or keeper. It is also occasionally found in other countries.

History
The surname Pal (or Paul) is found in Bengal among Bengali Kayasthas. Historian Tej Ram Sharma mentions that the surname is "now confined to Kayasthas of Bengal" while referring to the names of Brahmins ending in such Kayastha surnames in the early inscriptions dating back to the Gupta period.

Pal is also used as a surname by the Bengali Hindu Potters (Kumbhakars), and other castes Like Teli,   Subarnabanik and Sadgop.

The Pardhi, a hunter community of Maharashtra, is also known as Pal.

The saint Gwalipa told Suraj Sen, the ruler of Gwalior, to adopt the surname Pal, which remains prevalent up to eighty-three descendants of Suraj Sen.

The Ahirs in Central India use Pal as a surname. 

In imitation of Pal dynasty of Assam, the Chutia (pronounced as Sutia) also took the surname of Pal.

Pal was also a popular surname among the Parmar Rajput rulers of the Garhwal.

Pal is a surname of the Thakuri people of Nepal.

In Punjab and other states, Pal is often used as a middle name followed by Singh.

Pal is also used as a surname by the Punjabi Khatri community.

The rulers of Kullu held the surname Pal up to about the 15th century A.D., which they later changed to Singh.

Bengalis
In Bengal, during the reign of the Gupta Empire beginning in the 4th century AD, when systematic and large-scale colonization by Aryan Kayasthas and Brahmins first took place, Kayasthas were brought over by the Guptas to help manage the affairs of state. During this period, the Kayasthas had not developed into a distinct caste, although the office of the Kayasthas (scribes) had been instituted before the beginning of the period, as evidenced from the contemporary smritis. Tej Ram Sharma, an Indian historian, says that: 

Historian André Wink states: 

According to Radhey Shyam Chourasia, an Indian historian, the Palas do not trace their origin to any ancient hero. The dynasty is so called because the names of all kings had the termination - Pala. The family has no illustrious ancestry.

Historian Guptajit Pathak believes that the Palas of Kamarupa, who had the same surname as the Palas of Bengal and Bihar (Gaura and Magadha), "were perhaps of non-Aryan origin".

Several kings of the Pala dynasty were Buddhists.

According to the Khalimpur Plate of Dharmapala, Gopala I, the founder of the dynasty, "was the son of a warrior Vapyata and the grandson of a highly educated Dayitavishnu". Unlike other contemporary dynasties, the Palas "do not claim descent from any mythological figure or epic hero". The Kamauly Copper Plate inscription suggests that Palas call themselves Kshatriyas belonging to Solar dynasty. "According to Manjusree Mulakalpa, Gopala I was a sudra and according to Abul Fazl, the Palas were Kayasthas." In Ramacharita, the Pala King Rampala is called Kshatriya but later in the same book Dharmapala is described as Samudrakula-dipa. Bagchi suggests that "the non-mention of caste may be a reason that the Palas were Buddhists and they were not supposed to mention their caste like the Brahmanical ruling dynasties", though they performed the duties and functions of Kshatriyas for about four centuries.

Notables

India

Art 
Gogi Saroj Pal, Artist

Business 
Bipradas Pal Chowdhury, Bengali Industrialist
Karan Paul, Chairman of Apeejay Surrendra Group
Murugan Pal, Entrepreneur
Priya Paul, Indian Businesswoman (Sister of Karan Paul), Padmashree Awardee
Supriya Paul, Indian Entrepreneur, The Co-founder and CEO of Josh Talks

Entertainment 
Aditi Paul, Indian Playback Singer
Amala Paul (born 1991), Indian Film Actress in Tamil and Malayalam Cinema
Amar Pal, Indian Bengali Folk Singer and Author
Amit Paul, Indian Playback Singer
Amit Sebastian Paul, Indian-Swedish Singer and Businessman
Anindita Paul, Indian Singer
Anuradha Pal, Musical Composer, known as the Lady Zakir Hussain
Arpita Pal, Bengali Actress and Entrepreneur
Beena Paul (born 1961), Indian film editor in Malayalam
Colin Pal (1923-2005), Actor and Director (Grandson of Bipin Chandra Pal)
Imran Pal(Imran Khan), Bollywood Actor
Jai Paul, Indian-British Recording Artist
Manish Paul, Indian Actor,Comedian and TV Host
Niranjan Pal (1889-1959), Screenwriter and Director (Son of Bipin Chandra Pal)
Patralekha Paul, Indian Actress
Rajeev Paul, Indian Actor
Satya Paul, Indian Fashion Designer
Sohini Paul, Bengali Actress (Daughter of Tapas Paul)
Sunil Pal, Indian Actor and Comedian
Tapas Paul, Indian Bengali Actor and Politician

Judiciary 
Debi Prasad Pal (born 1927), Indian Lawyer, Judge and Cabinet Minister
Radhabinod Pal (1886-1967), Judge, Freedom Fighter, Padma Vibhushan Awardee
Ruma Pal (born 1941), Indian Supreme Court Judge

Politics 
Agnimitra Paul, Indian Politician, Fashion Designer
Bipin Chandra Pal (1858–1932), Indian Freedom Fighter, Journalist, Writer
Ila Pal Choudhury, Indian Politician, Social Activist
Jagdambika Pal (born1960), Former Chief Minister of Uttar Pradesh
Kristo Das Pal (1839–1884), Politician, Journalist, Orator and the editor of Hindoo Patriot
Rupchand Pal (born 1936), Politician
Saju Paul (born 1966), Indian Politician

Science 
Aloke Paul, Materials Scientist
Anadish Pal (born 1963), Inventor and Poet
Palash Baran Pal, Indian Physicist, Author
Sankar K. Pal, Scientist and Researcher, Director of the ISI-Calcutta, Padmashree Awardee
Sourav Pal, Scientist and Researcher, Director of National Chemical Laboratory, Pune, Pioneering figure of Quantum Chemistry in India
Vinod Kumar Paul, Indian Pediatrician and Physician Scientist

Sports 
Bachendri Pal, First Indian Woman to climb Mount Everest
Gostha Pal (1896–1976), Renowned Football Player, (The Great Wall of China)
Rajinder Pal, Cricketer
Shib Paul, Indian Cricketer
Subrata Pal, Football Player

Others 
Haridas Pal, Fictional Character and Successful Businessman
Krishna Pal (1762–1822), Early Indian convert to Christianity

References

See also
Paul (surname)

Surnames
Bengali Hindu surnames
Indian surnames
Kayastha